"Ça, C'est L'amour" is a popular song by Cole Porter, published in 1957. It was introduced in the film Les Girls.

The recording by Tony Bennett was made in New York City on September 19, 1957, (mx. CO 59855) and released by Columbia Records as catalog number 41032. It reached the Billboard magazine charts on November 18, 1957, its only week on the chart. On the Disk Jockey chart, it peaked at #22; on the composite chart of the top 100 songs, it reached #96.

References

Songs written by Cole Porter
1957 songs
Tony Bennett songs